This is a list of finalists for the 2008 Archibald Prize for portraiture. As the images are copyrighted, an external link to an image has been listed where available (listed is Artist – Title). 
	
Martin Ball – Neil Finn  (Winner of the Packing Room Prize 2008) Image
Del Kathryn Barton –  You are what is most beautiful about me, a self portrait with Kell and Arella (Winner of the Archibald Prize 2008) Image
Anthony Bennett –  Portrait of Jon Farriss in a Kylie T-shirt  
 Danelle Bergstrom –  Two movements – Peter Sculthorpe  
 Roger Boreham –  Dad, what a smile  (portrait of his father)
 Eolo Bottaro –  The Archibald  
Joanna Braithwaite –  Chook, chook, chook   (self-portrait)
David Bromley – Louise Olsen  
Jun Chen – Ian Smith  
Zhong Chen – Nicholas Harding  
Zhansui Kordelya Chi – Julius  (portrait of Julius Reade)
 Peteris Ciemitis –  Grabowsky  (portrait of Paul Grabowsky)
James Cochran – Akira  (portrait of Akira Isogawa)
Yvette Coppersmith – In the garland  (portrait of Paul Capsis)
Richard Dunlop –  Tim Olsen: the man in blackEvans Neil – Blue days, black nights  (self-portrait)
Vincent Fantauzzo – Heath  (portrait of Heath Ledger) (Winner of the People's Choice Award 2008) Image
Hong Fu – Dr Joseph Brown Image
Robert Hannaford – Alison Mitchell  (portrait of artist’s wife)
Zai Kuang –  The sisters – Celia and Julia  
Sam Leach –  Self in uniform  (self-portrait)
Barry McCann –  Simpatico (portrait of Maggie Beer and Simon Bryant)
Neil McIrvine – David Disher  
Alexander McKenzie – Sarah Blasko  
Lewis Miller –  Tom Lowenstein 
Anna Minardo –  The question (portrait of Bryan Dawe)
Paul Newton – Portrait of Donald McDonald AC John Phillips –  Wendy after two cups of coffee (portrait of Wendy Whiteley) Image
Rodney Pople –  Art is what you can get away with (self portrait) 
James Powditch –  Aden Young in 'Once upon a time in the inner west'  
Ben Quilty –  Self-portrait after Madrid 
Leslie Rice – Quartered, drawn and hung: Adam Cullen on public display  
Ryan Paul – Peter Booth, study with Cuban  
Jenny Sages – Anita and Luca  (portrait of Anita and Luca Belgiorno-Nettis)
Song Ling – Angelina Pwerle  
Nick Stathopoulos – At the movies with David Stratton (aka The big sleep)  
Xu Wang – Nick Waterlow  
Jan Williamson – Sue McPherson – artist  
Yi Wang – Long hair '' (self-portrait)

See also 
Previous year: List of Archibald Prize 2007 finalists
Next year: List of Archibald Prize 2009 finalists
List of Archibald Prize winners

External links
Archibald Prize 2008 finalists, official website, Art Gallery of NSW

2008
Archibald
Archibald Prize 2008
Archibald Prize 2008
2008 in art
Arch
Archibald